The Asian Highway Network (AH), also known as the Great Asian Highway, is a cooperative project among countries in Asia and the United Nations Economic and Social Commission for Asia and the Pacific (ESCAP) to improve their connectivity via highway systems. It is one of the three pillars of the Asian Land Transport Infrastructure Development (ALTID) project, endorsed by the ESCAP commission at its 48th session in 1992, comprising Asian Highway, Trans-Asian Railway (TAR) and facilitation of land transport projects.

Agreements have been signed by 32 countries to allow the highway to cross the continent and also reach to Europe. Some of the countries taking part in the highway project are India (Look-East connectivity projects), Sri Lanka, Pakistan, China, Iran, Japan, South Korea, Nepal and Bangladesh. Most of the funding comes from the larger, more advanced Asian nations such as China, South Korea and Singapore as well as international agencies such as the Asian Development Bank (ADB) and the Asian Infrastructure Investment Bank (AIIB).

The project aims to make maximum use of the continent's existing highways to avoid the construction of newer ones, except in cases where missing routes necessitate their construction. Project Monitor, an Asian infrastructure news website, has commented that "early beneficiaries of the Asian Highway project are the planners within the national land transport department of the participating countries [since] it assists them in planning the most cost-effective and efficient routes to promote domestic and international trade. Non-coastal areas, which are often negligible, are the other beneficiaries."

However, in the mid-2000s some transportation experts were skeptical about the viability of the project given the economic and political climate in both South and Southeast Asia.

History
The AH project was initiated by the United Nations in 1959 with the aim of promoting the development of international road transport in the region. During the first phase of the project (1960–1970) considerable progress was achieved, however, progress slowed down when financial assistance was suspended in 1975.

ESCAP has conducted several projects in cooperation with AH member countries step by step after the endorsement of ALTID in 1992.

The Intergovernmental Agreement on the Asian Highway Network (IGA) was adopted on November 18, 2003, by the Intergovernmental Meeting; the IGA includes Annex I, which identifies 55 AH routes among 32 member countries totalling approximately 140,000 km (87,500 miles), and Annex II "Classification and Design Standards". During the 60th session of the ESCAP Commission at Shanghai, China, in April 2004, the IGA treaty was signed by 23 countries. By 2013, 29 countries had ratified the agreement.

Implications
The advanced highway network would provide for greater trade and social interactions between Asian countries, including personal contacts, project capitalizations, connections of major container terminals with transportation points, and promotion of tourism via the new roadways.

Regional perceptions of the project
According to Om Prakash, "It's an excellent step taken by ESCAP to gather all the Asian countries under one crown but the problem with this project is political disputes between some countries, notably Pakistan and Myanmar, which is delaying the project".

Future Development Plans
Route AH1 is proposed to extend from Tokyo to the border with Bulgaria (EU) west of Istanbul and Edirne, passing through both Koreas, China and other countries in Southeast, Central and South Asia. The corridor is expected to improve trade links between East Asian countries, India and Russia. To complete the route, existing roads will be upgraded and new roads constructed to link the network. US$25 billion has been spent or committed as of 2007, with additional US$18 billion needed for upgrades and improvements to 26,000 km of highway.

Numbering and signage
The project new highway route numbers begin with "AH", standing for "Asian Highway", followed by one, two or three digits. Single-digit route numbers from 1 to 9 are assigned to major Asian Highway routes which cross more than one subregion. Two- and three-digit route numbers are assigned to indicate the routes within subregions, including those connecting to neighbouring subregions, and self-contained highway routes within the participating countries. Route numbers are printed in the Latin script and Hindu-Arabic numerals and may simply be added to existing signage, like the E-road network.

The actual design of the signs has not been standardized, only that the letters and digits are in white or black, but the color, shape and size of the sign being completely flexible. Most examples feature a blue rectangular shield with a white inscription (similar to German Autobahn signage) with further examples of white on green and black on white rectangular shields.

First entire car crossing
What is believed to be the first car crossing of the full extent (East to West) of the new Asian Highway was achieved by Britons Richard Meredith and Phil Colley in 2007 driving an Aston Martin.

Following the AH1 and the AH5 from Tokyo (the Highway grid's furthest point East) to Istanbul (furthest West), they drove a total of 12,089 km (7,511.8 miles) before joining the European motorway network for another 3,259 km (2,025 miles) to London.

Including ferry trips and customs clearance delays, the journey took 49 days and crossed 18 countries.

The completed route was verified by Aston Martin and the UN's Asian Commission (UNESCAP) in Bangkok, whose director of transport and tourism Barry Cable confirmed "I can warrant that, to my best knowledge, this was the first car to undertake this journey".

Eurowatch in London provided independent corroboration by tracking the car's location from satellite position reports and plotting the vehicle's location throughout the journey.

Meredith, a travel author and veteran of distance-driving events, agreed to make the attempt after attending the Asian Highway Treaty's "coming into force" ceremony in Bangkok on 4 July 2005.

He was lent an Aston Martin V8 Vantage, which had previously been the personal transport of the company's chief executive Dr Ulrich Bez and recruited Phil Colley, a linguist and travel expert from Kennington, South London, to be his co-driver. The car was shipped out to Tokyo by the company and they set off on 25 June 2007.

Although the trip was facilitated by UNESCAP through its member nations, there were still extensive problems including enforced detours and interminable customs clearance delays in China, pot-holed roads in Kazakhstan and leaded-only fuel in Uzbekistan. In Tbilisi, Georgia, the journey car crashed after being left on a hillside with its handbrake unsecured.

When the record-setting car returned, a welcome-home reception was staged by Aston Martin at the Park Lane Hotel in London and Meredith later received a civic award from his home town of Milton Keynes.

The car was sold at auction in December 2007 by Bonhams and the proceeds donated to UNICEF, the United Nations Children's Fund. In March 2008, a total collection of €83,000 was presented to UNICEF China for a campaign to reduce child deaths on the roads of Beijing.

Routes

AH1 to AH9: Continent-Wide Routes
  – : Tokyo, Japan – Bulgarian border, Turkey
  Border of Bulgaria – Kapıkule – Istanbul – Gerede – Ankara – Sivas – Refahiye – Aşkale – Doğubayazıt – Gürbulak –
  Bazargan – Ivughli – Tabriz – Qazvin – Tehran – Semnan – Damghan – Sabzevar – Mashhad – Dowqarun –
  Islam Qala – Herat – Delaram – Kandahar – Kabul – Torkham –
  Peshawar – Hassan Abdal – Rawalpindi (– Islamabad) – Lahore – Wagah –
  Attari – New Delhi – Agra – Kanpur – Varanasi – Mohania - Kolkata – Bongaon –
  Benapole – Jashore – Dhaka – Kachpur – Sylhet – Tamabil –
  Dawki – Shillong – Jorabat (– Guwahati) – Nagaon – Dimapur – Chümoukedima – Kohima – Viswema – Imphal – Moreh –
  Tamu – Mandalay – Meiktila – Payagyi (– Yangon) – Myawaddy –
  Mae Sot – Tak – Nakhon Sawan – Bang Pa-in (– Bangkok) – Hin Kong – Kabin Buri – Aranyaprathet –
  Poipet – Phnom Penh – Bavet –
  Mộc Bài – Ho Chi Minh City – Biên Hòa (– Vũng Tàu) – Nha Trang – Hội An – Da Nang – Huế – Đông Hà – Vinh – Hanoi – Đồng Đăng – Hữu Nghị –
  Youyiguan – Nanning – Guangzhou (– Shenzhen –  Hong Kong) – Xiangtan – Changsha – Wuhan – Xinyang – Zhengzhou – Shijiazhuang – Beijing – Shenyang – Dandong –
  Sinuiju – Pyongyang – Kaesong –
  Munsan – Seoul – Daejeon – Daegu – Gyeongju – Busan …
  Fukuoka – Tokyo
  – : Denpasar, Indonesia – Khosravi, Iran
  Khosravi – Hamadan – Saveh – Salafchegan (– Tehran) – Yazd – Anar – Kerman – Zahedan – Mirjaveh –
  Taftan – Quetta – Rohri – Multan – Lahore – Wagah –
  Attari – New Delhi – Rampur – Banbasa –
  Bramhadev Mandi – Mahendranagar – Kohalpur – Narayangarh – Pathlaiya – Kakarbhitta –
  Siliguri –
  Banglabandha– Rangpur– Hatikumrul – Dhaka – Kachpur – Sylhet – Tamabil –
  Dawki – Shillong – Jorabat (– Guwahati) – Nagaon – Dimapur – Chümoukedima – Kohima – Viswema – Imphal – Moreh –
  Tamu – Mandalay – Meiktila – Kengtung – Tachilek –
  Mae Sai – Chiang Rai – Tak – Nakhon Sawan – Bang Pa-in – Bangkok – Hat Yai – Sadao –
  Bukit Kayu Hitam – Butterworth – Kuala Lumpur – Seremban – Johor Bahru –
  Singapore – Sengkang
  Jakarta (– Merak) – Cikampek (– Bandung) – Semarang – Surakarta – Surabaya – Denpasar
  – : 
 Northern section: Ulan-Ude, Russia – Tanggu, China
  Ulan-Ude – Kyakhta –
  Altanbulag – Darkhan – Ulaanbaatar – Nalaikh – Choir – Sainshand – Zamyn-Üüd –
  Erenhot – Beijing – Tanggu
 Southern section: Shanghai, China – Chiang Rai, Thailand
  Shanghai – Hangzhou – Nanchang – Xiangtan – Guiyang – Kunming – Jinghong (– Daluo –  Mong La – Keng Tung) – Mohan, Yunnan –
  Boten – Nateuy – Houayxay –
  Chiang Khong – Chiang Rai
  – : Novosibirsk, Russia – Karachi, Pakistan
  Novosibirsk – Barnaul – Tashanta –
  Ulaanbaishint – Khovd – Yarantai
  Ürümqi – Kashgar – Honqiraf –
  Khunjerab – Hassanabdal – Rawalpindi – Islamabad – Lahore – Multan – Rohri – Hyderabad – Karachi
  – : Shanghai, China – Bulgarian border, Turkey
 Border of Bulgaria – Kapikule – Istanbul – Gerede – Merzifon – Samsun – Trabzon – Sarp –
  Batumi – Poti – Senaki – (Port of Anaklia – Zugdidi bypass road – Samtredia) Khashuri – Mtskheta – Tbilisi –
  Red Bridge – Qazax – Ganja – Gazi Mammed – Alat – Baku …
  Turkmenbashi – Serdar – Ashgabat – Tejen – Mary – Turkmenabat – Farap –
 Ələt – Bukhara – Navoi – Samarkand – Syrdaria – Tashkent – Chernyavka –
  Chernyaevka – Shymkent – Merki –
  Chaldovar – Kara Balta – Bishkek –
  Kordai – Kaskelen – Almaty –
  Khorgas – Jinghe – Kuytun – Ürümqi – Turpan – Lanzhou – Xi'an – Xinyang – Nanjing – Shanghai
  – : Busan, South Korea – Belarusian border, Russia
  Border of Belarus – Krasnoye – Moscow – Samara – Ufa – Chelyabinsk – Petukhovo –
  Chistoe – Petropavl – Karakoga –
  Isilkul – Omsk – Novosibirsk – Krasnoyarsk – Irkutsk – Ulan-Ude – Chita – Zabaykalsk –
  Manzhouli – Qiqihar – Harbin – Suifenhe –
  Pogranichny – Ussuriysk – Razdolnoye (– Vladivostok – Nahodka) – Khasan –
  Sonbong – Chongjin – Wonsan (– Pyongyang) –
  Goseong – Kansong – Gangneung – Gyeongju – Busan
  – : Yekaterinburg, Russia – Karachi, Pakistan
  Yekaterinburg – Chelyabinsk – Troisk –
  Kaerak – Kostanai – Astana – Karaganda – Burubaital – Merke –
  Chaldovar – Kara-Balta – Osh –
  Andijon – Tashkent – Syrdaria – Khavast –
  Khujand – Dushanbe – Nizhniy Panj –
  Shirkhan – Pol-e Khomri – Jabal Saraj – Kabul – Kandahar – Spin Boldak –
  Chaman – Quetta – Kalat – Karachi
  – : Finnish border, Russia – Bandar Emam, Iran
  Border of Finland – Torfyanovka – Vyborg – St. Petersburg – Moscow – Tambov – Borisoglebsk – Volgograd – Astrakhan – Khasavyurt – Mahachkala – Kazmalyarskiy –
  Samur – Sumgayit – Baku – Alat – Bilasuvar – Astara –
  Rasht – Qazvin – Tehran – Saveh – Ahvaz – Bandar-e Emam Khomeyni
  – 9,222 km (5,730 mi): St. Petersburg, Russia – Lianyungang, China
  St. Petersburg – Moscow – Ulyanovsk – Toliatti – Samara – Orenburg – Sagarchin –
  Zhaisan – Aktobe – Kyzylorda – Shymkent – Taraz – Almaty –
  Khorgas – Urumqi – Lianyungang

AH10 to AH29: Southeast Asia Routes

  – : Vientiane, Laos – Sihanoukville, Cambodia
  Vientiane – Ban Lao – Thakhek – Seno – Pakse – Veunkham – Tranpeangkreal –
  Stung Treng – Kratie – Phnom Penh – Sihanoukville
  – : Nateuy, Laos – Hin Kong, Thailand
 Nateuy – Oudomxai – Pakmong – Louang Phrabang – Vientiane – Thanaleng –
  Nong Khai – Udon Thani – Khon Kaen – Nakhon Ratchasima – Hin Kong
  – : Hanoi, Vietnam – Nakhon Sawen, Thailand
  Hanoi – Hoa Binh – Son La – Dien Bien – Tai Trang –
  Pang Hok – Muang Khoua – Oudomxai – Muang Ngeun –
  Huai Kon – Uttaradit – Phitsanulok – Nakhon Sawan
  – : Hai Phong, Vietnam – Mandalay, Myanmar
  Hai Phong – Hanoi – Viet Tri – Lao Cai – 
  Hekou – Kunming – Ruili – 
  Muse – Lashio – Mandalay
  – : Vinh, Vietnam – Udon Thani, Thailand
  Vinh – Cau Treo – 
  Keoneau – Ban Lao – Thakhek – 
  Nakhon Phanom – Udon Thani
  – : Đông Hà, Vietnam – Tak, Thailand
  Đông Hà – Lao Bao – 
  Densavanh – Seno – Savannakhet – 
  Mukdahan – Khon Kaen – Phitsanulok – Tak
  – : Đà Nẵng, Vietnam – Vũng Tàu, Vietnam
  Đà Nẵng – Kon Tum – Pleiku – Ho Chi Minh – Vũng Tàu
  – : Hat Yai, Thailand – Johor Bahru Causeway, Malaysia
  Hat Yai – Sungai Kolok – 
  Rantau Panjang – Kota Bahru – Kuantan – Johor Bahru – Johor Bahru Causeway
  – : Nakhon Ratchasima, Thailand – Bangkok, Thailand
  Nakhon Ratchasima – Kabin Buri – Laem Chabang – Chonburi – Bangkok
 AH21 – length unknown: Qui Nhơn, Vietnam – Serei Saophoan, Cambodia
  Quy Nhon port – Pleiku – Le Thanh – 
  O Yadav – Banlung – Stung Treng – Preah Vihear – Siem Reap – Serei Saophoan
  Trans-Sumatran Highway – : Banda Aceh, Indonesia – Merak, Indonesia
  Banda Aceh – Medan – Tebingtinggi – Dumai – Pekanbaru – Jambi – Palembang – Tanjung Karang – Bakauheni … Merak
  Pan-Philippine Highway – : Laoag, Philippines – Zamboanga, Philippines
  Laoag – Tuguegarao – Guiguinto – Quezon City (– Manila – Makati) – Makati – Calamba – Legazpi – Matnog … Allen – Tacloban (– Ormoc City … Cebu City) – Liloan … Surigao – Butuan – Davao (– Cagayan de Oro) – General Santos – Cotabato City – Zamboanga

AH100 to AH299: ASEAN Southeast Asia Routes
These routes were set up by the Association of Southeast Asian Nations as part of an extension to the Asian Highway Network, known as the ASEAN Highway Network.

AH30 to AH39: East Asia and Northeast Asia Routes

AH40 to AH59: South Asian Routes

AH60 to AH89: North Asia, Central Asia and Southwest Asia Routes

Distance by country or region

See also

 Other intercontinental highway systems: International E-road network, Pan-American Highway, Arab Mashreq International Road Network and Trans-African Highway network
 Trans-Asian Railway
 Japan–Korea Undersea Tunnel
 G3 Beijing–Taipei Expressway
 Seikan Tunnel
 One Belt, One Road
 Eurasian Land Bridge
 Bering land bridge
 Hippie trail

References

External links
 The project homepage
 Alternative link
 Intergovernmental Agreement on the Asian Highway Network
 Asia signs up to 'new Silk Road' BBC News report (April 26, 2004)
 UNESCAP press release announcing treaty
 2003 Asian Highway Handbook
 Pakistan's Gwadar to Afghanistan, China road declared Asian Highway
 Driven Together, Historic first crossing of Asia's new Highway to the West
 Asian Highway Network Details

 
Road transport in Asia
International road networks
United Nations Economic and Social Council